The Relief of the Poor Act 1782 (22 Geo. 3. c. 83), also known as Gilbert's Act, was a British poor relief law proposed by Thomas Gilbert which aimed to organise poor relief on a county basis, counties being organised into parishes which could set up poorhouses or workhouses between them. However, these workhouses were intended to help only the elderly, sick and orphaned, not the able-bodied poor. The sick, elderly and infirm were cared for in poorhouses whereas the able-bodied poor were provided with poor relief in their own homes. Gilbert's Act aimed to be more humane than the previous modification to the Poor Law, the Workhouse Test Act. During the 1780s, there was an increase in unemployment and underemployment due to high food prices, low wages and the effects of enclosing land. This caused poor rates to increase rapidly, which wealthy landowners found unacceptable.

The Act was repealed by the Statute Law Revision Act 1871.

Attempts to pass legislation
Thomas Gilbert attempted to pass an act "for the better relief and employment of the poor" in 1765. Gilbert was a supporter of the 5th Duke of Bedford, which led to his act being blocked by Charles Wentworth, 2nd Marquess of Rockingham. Gilbert tried for 17 years to get his bill passed by parliament, eventually succeeding during Rockingham's second term as prime minister.

References

External links
Information on the Act

Great Britain Acts of Parliament 1782
Poor Law in Britain and Ireland
Repealed Great Britain Acts of Parliament